The 2018 AFF U-19 Youth Championship was the 16th edition of the AFF U-19 Youth Championship, organised by ASEAN Football Federation. It was hosted by Indonesia during July 2018. Eleven out of the twelve member associations of the ASEAN Football Federation took part in the tournament featuring two groups of five and six teams.

Malaysia beat Myanmar 4–3 in the final for their first title in the championship.

Participant teams 
All of 12 teams from member associations of the ASEAN Football Federation were eligible for the tournament. Only Australia did not enter the tournament.
A total of 11 teams from 11 member associations entered the tournament, listed below:

Venues

Squads

Group stage 
 All times listed are Indonesia Western Standard Time (UTC+7).

Group A

Group B

Knockout stage 
In the knockout stage, the penalty shoot-out is used to decide the winner if necessary.

Bracket

Semi-finals

Third place match

Final

Winner

Awards

Incident 
At the end of semi-finals match between Indonesia and Malaysia during the preparation for penalty shoot-out, the stadium suddenly faced a power outage. The Perusahaan Listrik Negara (PLN) explained that it is not caused from their power distribution since the stadium management only use PLN distribution outside the stadium. When the match was resumed and the penalty shoot-out ended with a score 3–2 against the host, dissatisfied Indonesian supporters began to throw bottles and rocks at the Malaysian team after their team failed to qualify to the finals which caused the Malaysian team to run to their dressing room for safety. The Football Association of Indonesia (PSSI) then sent a letter of apology to the Football Association of Malaysia (FAM) and promised such incident will never recurred again in the future tournament they host. A meeting was then held between Indonesian Sports Minister Imam Nahrawi and Malaysian Sports Minister Syed Saddiq in response towards the incident.

Goalscorers 
7 goals

  Win Naing Tun

6 goals

  Bounphachan Bounkong
  Myat Kaung Khant

5 goals

  Korrawit Tasa
  Mehti Sarakham

4 goals

  Kheang Menghour
  Fidel Tacardon

3 goals

  Rafli Mursalim
  Saddil Ramdani
  Shivan Pillay Asokan
  Lê Văn Nam
  Nguyễn Hữu Thắng

2 goals

  Narong Kakada
  Nop David
  Todd Rivaldo Ferre
  Nilan
  Akhyar Rashid
  Nik Akif
  Pyae Sone Naing
  Muhammad Syahadat Masnawi
  Pithak Phaphirom
  Suphanat Mueanta
  Mouzinho de Lima
  Paulo Gali
  Lê Minh Bình

1 goal

  Muhammad Rahimin
  Egy Maulana Vikri
  Feby Eka Putra
  Firza Andika
  Rifad Marasabessy
  Syahrian Abimanyu
  Witan Sulaeman
  Chitpasong Latthachack
  Kittisak Phomvongsa
  Kydavone Souvanny
  Lextoxa Thongsavath
  Phoutthasone Vongkosy
  Awang Muhammad Faiz
  Nizarrudin Jazi
  Syahmi Zambri
  Syaiful Alias
  Hlawn Moe Oo
  Ye Yint Aung
  Chester Gio Pabualan
  Akmal Azman
  Narakorn Noomchansakul
  Nattawut Chootiwat
  Sittichok Paso
  Celso Rebelo Garcia
  Đặng Văn Tới
  Trần Danh Trung

1 own goal

  Xayasith Singsavang (playing against Vietnam)

References

External links 
 

2018
2018 in AFF football
2018 in youth association football
International association football competitions hosted by Indonesia